The Canon de 105 modèle 1925/27 Schneider was a heavy field gun used by Greece during World War II. It was bought at the same time as the Canon de 85 modèle 1927 Schneider The Germans allotted this gun the designation of 10.5 cm Kanone 340(g), but it is unknown if they actually used them themselves.

References 
 Chamberlain, Peter & Gander, Terry. Light and Medium Field Artillery. New York: Arco, 1975

World War II artillery of Greece
World War II field artillery
105 mm artillery
Schneider Electric